Love Is a Gun is a 1994 straight-to-video erotic thriller film directed and written by David Hartwell and starring Eric Roberts and Kelly Preston.

Plot
Jack Hart (Roberts), a novice LAPD crime-scene-photographer, is experiencing marital problems when he discovers a poster of an enigmatic woman. After attempting to enter a photo contest at the Forensics Department, he tracks down the model, a photographer in her own right, Jean Starr (Preston). Hart becomes infatuated with Starr, and the two enter an affair, much to the dismay of their respective spouses. Starr proves to be manipulative and vengeful and begins stalking Hart and his wife after he attempts to end their relationship. Starr ends up dead, with Hart as an obvious suspect.

Cast
Eric Roberts — Jack Hart
Kelly Preston — Jean Starr
Eliza Roberts (real-life wife of Eric Roberts) — Isabel
R. Lee Ermey — Frank Deacon
Marshall Bell — Jean's husband

References

External links

Trimark Pictures films
1994 films
American erotic thriller films
1990s English-language films
1990s American films